Lark is a surname and a given name which may refer to:

Surname
 Frank Lark (died 1946), New Zealand politician
 Hoyt W. Lark (1893–1971), a mayor of Cranston, Rhode Island, United States
 Jim Lark, professor of systems engineering and applied mathematics and United States Libertarian Party National Chairman from 2000 to 2002
 K. Gordon Lark (1930–2020), American biologist
 Maria Lark (born 1997), Russian-American actress
 Michael Lark, American comics artist
 Sarah Lark (born 1983), Welsh singer and actress
 Sylvia Lark (1947–1990) Seneca painter and printmaker
 Tobi Lark (born 1941), American-born Canadian soul and gospel singer

Given name
 Lark Pien (born c. 1972), American cartoonist                  
 Lark Voorhies (born 1974), American actress

See also
Larke                             

Feminine given names
Given names derived from birds